Nixor College is an independent English-medium school for GCE A Levels in D.H.A, Karachi, Pakistan. It was founded in 2008 by Nadeem Ghani, Nasir Ghani, Naushad Karamali, and a group of teachers. In recent years, the school has risen up the tables and has worked its way to become one of the best A Level Colleges in Pakistan through academic and co-curricular achievements, university placements, and teaching quality.

Extracurricular activities 
While the school focuses highly on academics, much attention is devoted to extra-curricular activities too. Students engage in structured extracurriculars such as Nixor Government, Nixor Corporate, the Teaching Assistant program, the Board of Directors, sports, and debates.

Nixor College has recently added E-Sports into their Extra Curricular Program.

Nixor Corporate 
The Corporate Entities of Nixor College include (and may not be limited to):

Out of the above Entities, Hamara Ghar and Nixor Engineering, Research & Development (N.E.R.D.) have been deprecated. The largest Corporate Entity is Nixor Hospital, followed by Nixor Financial Services.

References

External links
 Nixor College - Official Website

Private schools in Pakistan
Schools in Karachi
2008 establishments in Pakistan